Mkokotoni is a city located on the Tanzanian island of Unguja (Zanzibar). The city serves as the capital of the Zanzibar North region.

References

Regional capitals in Tanzania
Cities in Zanzibar
Unguja North Region